Malvern College Hong Kong is a British international school in Pak Shek Kok, Hong Kong, China. The school is an affiliate of Malvern College in Malvern, Worcestershire, United Kingdom.

The college's affiliated preschool and kindergarten, Malvern College Pre-School Hong Kong is located at Coronation Circle in West Kowloon.

Curriculum
The school adopts the International Baccalaureate curriculum, with classes from Year 1 to Year 13.

School uniform
The school uses a British school uniform, with adjustments to fit the Hong Kong weather: short sleeve shirts, a different sports kit, and a lack of requirement of jackets. Headmaster Robin A Lister stated that the uniform's "Britishness" is a key element.

Facilities
The school campus, of reinforced concrete structure in constructivist style, was designed by Palmer & Turner Group, constructed by BuildKing Holdings and completed in 2018. The school features a cantilevered roof ball court, a continuous interweaving staircase, vertical greenery and multiple sky terraces. The school houses a swimming pool, a performance venue, an indoor gymnasium, and a library with bookshelves arranged in the format of an amphitheatre.

The school campus was the first international school in Hong Kong being awarded the Leading Energy and Environmental Design (LEED) Gold Certification from the US Green Building Council. The campus also received Quality Building Award 2020 Hong Kong Non-Residential (New Building – Government, Institution or Community) Merit Award.

See also
 Britons in Hong Kong
 Consulate General of the United Kingdom in Hong Kong

References

British international schools in Hong Kong
Tai Po
Pak Shek Kok